Himalaya International School is a co-educational boarding school in Ratlam, India.

References

External links 

 School Website

International schools in India
Boarding schools in Madhya Pradesh
Schools in Madhya Pradesh
Ratlam